Lindeth Tower is a Victorian folly in Silverdale, Lancashire, England. It is an embattled square tower of three storeys. It was built in 1842 by the Preston banker Hesketh Fleetwood. Elizabeth Gaskell stayed in the tower in the 1840s and 1850s and her novel Ruth was written there. Lindeth Tower is a Grade II listed building.

See also

Listed buildings in Silverdale, Lancashire

References

Buildings and structures in the City of Lancaster
Grade II listed buildings in Lancashire
Folly towers in England
Towers completed in 1842